The 1996 Ukrainian Cup Final is a football match that took place at the NSC Olimpiyskiy on May 26, 1996. The match was the 5th Ukrainian Cup Final and it was contested by FC Dynamo Kyiv and FC Nyva Vinnytsia. The 1996 Ukrainian Cup Final was the fifth to be held in the Ukrainian capital Kyiv. Dynamo won with goals from Serhii Rebrov and Yuri Maxymov. 

There were four yellow cards issued at this game: two to Dynamo players and two to Nyva.

Road to Kyiv 

Both teams started from the first round of the competition (1/16). Dynamo traveled two rounds to central Ukraine and then for the quarter-finals and semi-finals the club played at its home ground. Nyva reached the final in a similar way. The first couple of rounds it spent traveling around the Lviv Oblast and then also played at its home turf. In the semi-finals Nyva swept Shakhtar aside with a remarkable 3:0 win. Neither Dynamo nor Nyva had allowed any goals past their goalkeepers.

Match details

Match statistics

See also
 Ukrainian Cup 1995-96

References

External links 
 Calendar of Matches - Schedule of the 1996 Ukrainian Cup on the Ukrainian Soccer History web-site (ukrsoccerhistory.com). 

Cup Final
Ukrainian Cup finals
Ukrainian Cup Final 1996
Ukrainian Cup Final 1996
Sports competitions in Kyiv